The Roskilde Festival 2018 was held on 1 to 7 July 2018 in Roskilde, Denmark. The festival was headlined by Gorillaz, Nick Cave and the Bad Seeds, Nine Inch Nails, Eminem, Bruno Mars, St. Vincent, Khalid, Nephew, David Byrne, Massive Attack, Dua Lipa and Anderson .Paak & the Free Nationals. Rapper Cardi B was set to headline the festival but cancelled due to her pregnancy.

Headlining set lists
Wednesday, 4 July 2018
{{Hidden
| headercss = color:#ffffff; background: #FF6200; font-size: 100%; width: 95%;;
| contentcss = text-align: left; font-size: 100%; width: 95%;;
| header = Eminem
| content =

"Medicine Man"
"Won't Back Down"
"3 a.m."
"Square Dance"
"Kill You"
"White America"
"Rap God"
"Sing for the Moment"
"Like Toy Soldiers"
"Forever"
"Just Don't Give a Fuck"
"Framed"
"Criminal"
"The Way I Am"
"Walk on Water" with Skylar Grey
"Stan" with Skylar Grey
"Love the Way You Lie" with Skylar Grey
"Berzerk"
"'Till I Collapse"
"Cinderella Man"
"Fast Lane"
"River"
"The Monster"
"My Name Is"
"The Real Slim Shady"
"Without Me"
"Not Afraid"

Encore
"Lose Yourself"
}}

{{Hidden
| headercss = color:#ffffff; background: #FF6200; font-size: 100%; width: 95%;;
| contentcss = text-align: left; font-size: 100%; width: 95%;;
| header = St. Vincent
| content =

"Sugarboy"
"Los Ageless"
"Savior"
"Masseduction"
"Huey Newton"
"Year of the Tiger"
"Marrow"
"Pills"
"Cruel"
"Cheerleader"
"Digital Witness"
"Rattlesnake"
"Young Lover"
"Fear the Future"
"Slow Disco"

Encore
"New York"
"Happy Birthday, Johnny"
"Severed Crossed Fingers"
}}

Thursday, 5 July 2018
{{Hidden
| headercss = color:#ffffff; background: #FF6200; font-size: 100%; width: 95%;;
| contentcss = text-align: left; font-size: 100%; width: 95%;;
| header = Bruno Mars
| content =

"Finesse"
"24K Magic"
"Treasure"
"Perm"
"Calling All My Lovelies"
"Chunky"
"That's What I Like"
"Versace on the Floor"
"Marry You"
"Runaway Baby"
"When I Was Your Man"
"Grenade"
"Locked Out of Heaven"
"Just the Way You Are"

Encore
"Uptown Funk"
}}

{{Hidden
| headercss = color:#ffffff; background: #FF6200; font-size: 100%; width: 95%;;
| contentcss = text-align: left; font-size: 100%; width: 95%;;
| header = Nephew
| content =

"Grundvold"
"Mexico ligger i Spanien"
"Igen & Igen &"
"Byens Hotel"/"Bazooka"
"Frankenstein (i Ring PART 1)"
"Movie klip"
"Du danske supersommer (Superliga)"
"First Blood Harddisk"
"007 Is Also Gonna Die"
"Va fangool!"
"Tropper"
"Hjertestarter"
"Worst/Best Case Scenario"
"Police Bells & Church Sirens"

Encore
"Sig månen langsomt hæver"
"Amsterdam"
}}

Friday, 6 July 2018

{{Hidden
| headercss = color:#ffffff; background: #FF6200; font-size: 100%; width: 95%;;
| contentcss = text-align: left; font-size: 100%; width: 95%;;
| header = Massive Attack
| content =

"Hymn of the Big Wheel"
"Risingson"
"United Snakes"
"Ritual Spirit"
"Girl I Love You"
"Eurochild"
"Future Proof"
"Voodoo In My Blood" with Young Fathers
"Way Up Here"
"Angel"
"Inertia Creeps"
"Safe from Harm"

Encore
"Take It There"
"Unfinished Sympathy"
}}

Saturday, 7 July 2018
{{Hidden
| headercss = color:#ffffff; background: #FF6200; font-size: 100%; width: 95%;;
| contentcss = text-align: left; font-size: 100%; width: 95%;;
| header = Gorillaz
| content =

"M1 A1"
"Tranz"
"Last Living Souls"
"Rhinestone Eyes"
"Tomorrow Comes Today"
"Every Planet We Reach Is Dead"
"Humility"
"Superfast Jellyfish" with De La Soul
"On Melancholy Hill"
"El Mañana"
"Strobelite" with Peven Everett
"Andromeda"
"Hollywood" with Jamie Principle
"Out of Body" with Moonchild Sanelly
"Garage Palace" with Little Simz
"Stylo" with Peven Everett and Bootie Brown
"Magic City"
"Dirty Harry" with Bootie Brown
"Feel Good Inc. with De La Soul
"Souk Eye"

Encore
"Lake Zurich"
"Saturnz Barz"
"Kids with Guns"
"Clint Eastwood" with Del the Funky Homosapien
}}
{{Hidden
| headercss = color:#ffffff; background: #FF6200; font-size: 100%; width: 95%;;
| contentcss = text-align: left; font-size: 100%; width: 95%;;
| header = Dua Lipa
| content =

"Blow Your Mind (Mwah)"
"Dreams" / "No Lie"
"My Love"
"Lost in Your Light"
"Be the One"
"Genesis"
"One Kiss"
"Scared to Be Lonely"
"No Goodbyes"
"Hotter than Hell"
"Begging"

Encore
"IDGAF"
"New Rules"
}}
{{Hidden
| headercss = color:#ffffff; background: #FF6200; font-size: 100%; width: 95%;;
| contentcss = text-align: left; font-size: 100%; width: 95%;;
| header = Anderson .Paak & The Free Nationals
| content =

"Come Down"
"The Waters"
"Glowed Up"
"Bubblin"
"The Season / Carry Me"
"Put Me Thru"
"Heart Don't Stand a Chance"
"Gidget"
"Room in Here"
"The Bird"
"Suede"
"Am I Wrong"
"Lite Weight"
"Luh You"

Encore
"The Dreamer"
}}

Lineup
Headline performers are listed in boldface. Artists listed from latest to earliest set times.

References

External links

Roskilde Festival by year
2018 music festivals